A Manual of Turkish Cookery (Mecmua-i Et'ime-i Osmaniye)(Osmanlı Yemekleri Mecmuası), is a Turkish cookbook that was written in 1864 by Türabi Efendi. It is an English translation of Melceü't-Tabbâhîn.

References

Ottoman cuisine
Turkish cuisine
Turkish cookbooks